The Fingal hurling team is an inter-county hurling team representing Fingal in the Kehoe Cup, the National Hurling League and the Nicky Rackard Cup. It is organised by the Dublin GAA and was established in 2008.  Fingal are currently managed by Mick Kennedy of the Fingallians club.

The Fingal team is made up of players from Dublin clubs within the Fingal region. While players from Fingal are eligible to play for the Dublin county team, players from outside of Fingal are not eligible to play for the Fingal county team. The Fingal catchment area stretches from Blanchardstown to Balbriggan and contains a total of 16 clubs; these include Castleknock, Erin go Bragh, Fingallians, Naomh Barróg, Naomh Mearnóg, O'Dwyers, Setanta, Skerries Harps, St Brigid's, St Finians (N), St Maurs, St Pats Donabate, St Peregrines, St Sylvester's, Trinity Gaels and Wild Geese.

History

In 2007, the GAA announced that hurling teams from Fingal and "South Down" (i.e. excluding the Ards peninsula) would compete at inter-county level in parallel to the main Dublin and Down hurling teams, to encourage hurling in these areas where the game had not been strong. In 2008, Fingal entered the Kehoe Cup which is a pre-season tournament for second and third-tier inter-county and third-level hurling teams. Fingal won their debut match against IT Tallaght by 3–12 to 1–11 to qualify for the quarter-final stages. Their next match was drawn against Carlow whom they lost to by 1–13 to 1–10. Later that year, both Fingal and South Down were entered into the Nicky Rackard Cup, a competition for the third-tier hurling teams of the All-Ireland Senior Hurling Championship. Fingal qualified for the semi-finals after finishing top of their group and beating Leitrim in the quarter-finals by 1–19 to 0–12. However, Fingal lost the semi-final to Sligo by 1–16 to 0–11, who later went on to win the competition.

Fingal claimed their first piece of silverware in 2012 when they won the Kehoe Cup Shield, beating Armagh in the final by 4–11 to 1–14. They topped off the year by winning division 3A of the National Hurling League after Monaghan refused to play in the final.

However in 2013 they won the National Hurling League Division 3A Final and a season later reached the final of the Nicky Rackard Cup where they eventually lost to Tyrone.

The Fingal hurling project was eventually disbanded in 2016.

Sponsorship
In April 2012, the Dublin County Board announced a new partnership with Dublin Airport Authority (DAA) which would provide the Fingal team with a sponsor for the first time in its 5-year history. The DAA had previously supported local GAA clubs in the Fingal area including St Margarets, Naomh Mearnóg and St Sylvesters.

Management team
Manager: Mick Kennedy (Fingallians)
Selectors: Sean McGarry (Skerries Harps), Des Foley (St Vincents), Liam Mac Cuirc (Setanta)

Managerial history

Honours
Senior
National Hurling League Division 3A: 2
2012, 2013
Kehoe Cup Shield: 1
2012

Minor
All-Ireland Minor 'C' Hurling Championships: 1
2012

References

External links
Dublin County Board Website
Friends of Dublin Hurling

2008 establishments in Ireland
Hurling in County Dublin
hurling